Gareth Hughes (born 1 April 1971) is a British dressage rider. Representing Great Britain, he competed at the 2014 World Equestrian Gamesat the 2013 European Dressage Championship and at the 2019 European Dressage Championship.

Altogether, Hughes has won three medals at various championships (two silver and one bronze). Meanwhile, his best individual championship result is 15th place from the 2021 European Championships.

References

Living people
1971 births
British male equestrians